Joseph James Shepley (born in Yonkers, New York on August 7, 1930; March 26, 2016) was an American jazz trumpeter. He worked with Burt Collins, Mike Longo, Duke Pearson and others. He can be heard in the docudrama Pumping Iron.

Discography

With Ron Carter
Parade (Milestone, 1979)
 Empire Jazz (RSO, 1980)
With Lou Donaldson
Sweet Lou (Blue Note, 1974)
With O'Donel Levy
Breeding of Mind (Groove Merchant, 1972)
With Duke Pearson
It Could Only Happen with You (Blue Note, 1970)
With Lonnie Liston Smith
Reflections of a Golden Dream (RCA/Flying Dutchman, 1976)
With Kai Winding
The In Instrumentals (Verve, 1965)

References

External links 
Blog of Joe Shepley

American jazz trumpeters
American male trumpeters
20th-century American musicians
20th-century trumpeters
1930 births
2016 deaths
People from Yonkers, New York
Jazz musicians from New York (state)
20th-century American male musicians
American male jazz musicians